Lee Sung-kyung (born August 10, 1990) is a South Korean model, actress and singer. She is best known for her roles in television series Cheese in the Trap (2016), The Doctors (2016), Weightlifting Fairy Kim Bok-joo (2016), Dr. Romantic 2 (2020), and Sh**ting Stars (2022).

Early life and education 
Lee was born on August 10, 1990, in Goyang city, Gyeonggi, South Korea. On February 22, 2016, Lee graduated from Dongduk Women's University.

Career
Lee began her entertainment career as a model where she competed at the local Super Model Contest in 2008. In 2013, The Papers collaborated with Lee with the single "I Love You". 

In 2014, Lee made her acting debut with a supporting role in television drama It's Okay, That's Love, being the first model-actress promoted under YG KPlus, the joint venture of YG Entertainment and K-Plus. This was followed by weekend drama, Flower of Queen in 2015. She won "Best New Actress" in a Special Project Drama at the MBC Drama Awards for her role.

In January 2016, Lee featured in tvN's college romance series, Cheese in the Trap. On April 28, 2016, Lee released a collaboration single with Eddy Kim, which is a cover of Sharp's "My Lips like Warm Coffee". Lee then starred in the SBS' prime-time medical drama, The Doctors as a neurosurgeon. The same year, she took on her first leading role in Weightlifting Fairy Kim Bok-joo, a youth sports drama inspired by the real-life story of Olympic weightlifting champion Jang Mi-ran. 

In 2017, Lee dubbed the film Trolls alongside Park Hyung-sik. She was also cast in the romance film Love+Sling, directed by first-time director Kim Dae-woong. She was also featured in Psy's 4X2=8 with the single "Last Scene". In 2018, Lee starred in the fantasy melodrama About Time. She was cast in the action comedy film Miss & Mrs. Cops released on May 9, 2019, alongside Ra Mi-ran.

In 2020, Lee starred in the second season of the hit medical drama Dr. Romantic, playing Cha Eun-jae, a skilled cardiothoracic surgeon with Ahn Hyo-seop as her leading man.

In 2022, Lee starred in the tvN drama Sh**ting Stars alongside Kim Young-dae.

Philanthropy 
On August 12, 2022, Lee donated  to help those affected by the 2022 South Korean floods through the Hope Bridge Korea Disaster Relief Association.

Filmography

Discography

Singles

Other charted songs

Awards and nominations

Notes

References

External links

 
 
 

South Korean film actresses
South Korean television actresses
South Korean female models
1990 births
Living people
YG Entertainment artists
21st-century South Korean actresses
People from Goyang
Dongduk Women's University alumni